Chaupi Orco (possibly from in the Quechua spelling Chawpi Urqu; chawpi middle, center, urqu mountain) or Viscachani (possibly from the Aymara 'wisk'acha viscacha) is a mountain in the Andes on the border of Bolivia and Peru. On the Bolivian side it is located in the La Paz Department, Franz Tamayo Province, Pelechuco Municipality, and on the Peruvian side it lies in the Puno Region, Putina Province, Sina District. It lies north of Salluyu. Chaupi Orco is the highest peak of the Apolobamba mountain range.

Elevation 
Other data from available digital elevation models: SRTM yields 6001 metres, ASTER 6028 metres, ALOS 6015 metres and TanDEM-X 6071 metres. The height of the nearest key col is 4489 meters, leading to a topographic prominence of 1555 meters. Chaupi Orco is considered a Mountain Range according to the Dominance System  and its dominance is 25.73%. Its parent peak is Ausangate and the Topographic isolation is 236 kilometers.

First Ascent 
Chaupi Orco was first climbed by Werner Karl, Hans Richter and Hans Wimmer (Germany) August 01st 1957.

External links 

 Elevation information about Chaupi Orco
 Weather Forecast at Chaupi Orco

See also
 List of mountains in the Andes
 List of Ultras of South America

References

Mountains of La Paz Department (Bolivia)
Mountains of Peru
Glaciers of Bolivia
International mountains of South America
Bolivia–Peru border
Mountains of Puno Region
Six-thousanders of the Andes